Agnès Delahaie (17 September 1920 – 8 December 2003), also known as Annie Dorfmann, was a French actress and film producer and the wife of Robert Dorfmann. She was nominated (as Annie Dorfmann) for Best Foreign Language Film at the 29th Academy Awards for producing Gervaise (1956).

Delahaie died in Paris in December 2003 at the age of 83.

Filmography
Actress
 Justice Is Done (1950)
 Three Women (1952)
Producer
 Gervaise (credited as Annie Dorfmann) (1956)
 Young Girls Beware (1957)
 One Life (credited as Annie Dorfmann) (1958)
 Pickpocket (1959)
 The Trial of Joan of Arc (1962)
 The Second Twin (1966)

References

External links

1920 births
2003 deaths
French film actresses
French film producers
20th-century French women